Villere or Villeré is a surname. Notable people with the surname include:

Charles Jacques Villeré (1828–1899), Confederate legislator from Louisiana
Jacques Phillippe Villeré (1761–1830), Governor of Louisiana
Roger F. Villere, Jr. (born 1949), American businessman and politician